Amara communis is a species of beetle in the family Carabidae found in Ireland, from Siberia to Kamchatka, and Caucasus. The species are 6–8mm in length, and live in moss.

References

communis
Beetles of Europe
Beetles described in 1797
Taxa named by Georg Wolfgang Franz Panzer